VLK may refer to :
 Vlk, a Czechoslovak surname
 Volume license key, a type of product activation key
 Vladivostok Air, a Russian airline
 Villivakkam railway station, Chennai, Tamil Nadu, India (station code)